Helen may refer to:

People

 Helen of Troy, in Greek mythology, the most beautiful woman in the world
 Helen (actress) (born 1938), Indian actress
 Helen (given name), a given name (including a list of people with the name)

Places
 Helen, Georgia, United States, a small city
 Helen, Maryland, United States, an unincorporated place
 Helen, Washington, an unincorporated community in Washington state, US
 Helen, West Virginia, a census-designated place in Raleigh County
 Helen Falls, a waterfall in Ontario, Canada
 Lake Helen (disambiguation), several places called Helen Lake or Lake Helen
 Helen, an ancient name of Makronisos island, Greece
 The Hellenic Republic, Greece

Arts, entertainment, and media
 Helen (album), a 1981 Grammy-nominated album by Helen Humes
 Helen (2008 film), a British drama starring Annie Townsend
 Helen (2009 film), an American drama film starring Ashley Judd
 Helen (2017 film), an Iranian drama film
 Helen (2019 film), an Indian film produced by Vineeth Sreenivasan
 Helen (Inheritance), a fictional supporting character in Christopher Paolini's Inheritance trilogy
 Helen (novel), an 1834 novel by Maria Edgeworth
 Helen (play), a play by Euripides
 Helen (EP), an EP by Helen Shapiro
 Helen (song) or "Hélène", 1989, by Roch Voisine
 Helen, Sweetheart of the Internet, an American comic strip
 Helen Dubois, a character from the Nickelodeon sitcom Drake & Josh
 Helen Hawkins, main character of 2018–2019 show Siren who is actually a human/mermaid hybrid

Other uses
 Helen (rocket), an ARCA demonstration vehicle
 Helen (unit), a humorous unit of measuring beauty
 Helen Oy, Finnish energy company in Helsinki, Finland
 , curved supports at the end of the shells of an extinct group of marine invertebrates
 Nakajima Ki-49, a Japanese World War II bomber given the reporting name "Helen"
 Tropical Storm Helen, list of storms named Helen

See also

 
Elena (disambiguation)
Eleni (disambiguation)
Ellen (disambiguation)
Helen of Troy (disambiguation)
Helena (disambiguation)
Helene (disambiguation)
Hélène (disambiguation)
Helenus, son of King Priam of Troy
Hellen, son of Deucalion and Pyrrha, the mythic ancestor of the Greeks
Hellenic (disambiguation), pertaining to Greece or the Greeks
St. Helen (disambiguation)
Yelena
Helon (disambiguation)